The 146th New York Infantry Regiment, nicknamed Garrard's Tigers, was a Federal regiment which mustered on October 10, 1862, and mustered out on July 16, 1865. The regiment was raised and organized in Rome, New York, and was known as the 5th Oneida Regiment. Another nickname for this unit was the Halleck's Infantry, after New York-born general Henry Halleck.

Uniform

This regiment at first wore the regular dark blue New York state jacket, light blue trousers, and dark blue forage cap, but when the veterans from 5th New York Volunteer Infantry Regiment, a famous Zouave unit, were transferred to the 146th New York, the regiment switched over to the colorful Zouave dress on 3 June 1863 at Falmouth, Va. 
The new uniform was not actually Zouave, but rather the colorful dress of the French-Turco style. Its most distinctive features were a sky blue zouave jacket with yellow trimming, a red fez with a yellow tassel, sky blue zouave pantaloons, and a red sash.

Battle History

The 146th New York participated in the battles of: Fredericksburg, Chancellorsville, Gettysburg, Williamsport, Wilderness Tavern, Spotsylvania Court House, North Anna, Totopotomy Creek, Cold Harbor, Siege of Petersburg, Weldon Railroad, White Oak Ridge, Five Forks, Rappahannock Station, Bristoe Station, White Oak Swamp, Popular Springs Church, Hatcher's Run, and Appomattox Court House.

Casualties
The 146th New York suffered severe casualties by the end of the war. The regiment was nearly decimated at the battle of the Wilderness (Saunders Field) where many were cut off by the fires of the battle.  Out of a number of 1,707 men, their losses were: 
7 officers and 126 men killed in action and/or mortally wounded, 
2 officers and 187 men who died of sickness and/or other things, 
and 1 officer and 87 men who died in captivity, many at the Andersonville prison camp.

See also
 List of New York Civil War regiments

References

Further reading
Brainard, Mary Genevie Green. Campaigns of the 146th Regiment New York State Volunteers Also Known as Halleck's Infantry, the Fifth Oneida, and Garrad's Tigers. New York, London, G. P. Putnam's sons, 1915
Out of the Wilderness: The Civil War Memoir of Cpl. Norton Shepard, 146th New York Volunteer Infantry, ed. Raymond W. Smith Hamilton: Edmonston Publishing, Inc., 1998.

External links
The Civil War in the East: 146th New York Volunteer Infantry Regiment

Infantry 146
1862 establishments in New York (state)
Military units and formations established in 1862
Military units and formations disestablished in 1865